Tsetang or Zedang, is the fourth largest city in Tibet and is located in the Yarlung Valley,  southeast of Lhasa in Nedong District of the Shannan Prefecture in the Tibet region of China. It is the capital of Shannan Prefecture (which is also referred to as "Shannan City").

Tsetang has been the capital of the Yarlung region since antiquity and was the seat of the ancient emperors of Tibet and, as such, a place of great importance. In the 19th century, it is said to have comprised some 1,000 houses, a bazaar, a gompa and a fort.

As the capital of Shannan, it is the second-largest settlement in the historical Ü-Tsang region.

Tsetang is situated near the flank of Mount Gongbori where many ancient ruins are located. It is known as the cradle of Tibetan's civilization. Samye, Tibet's first monastery, is located only  from Tsetang and was founded in 779 CE by King Trisong Detsen.

The 14th century monastery of Tsetang, Ganden Chökhorling, was originally Kagyupa but was taken over by the Gelugpas in the 18th century. It was destroyed during the Cultural Revolution in the 1960s but has been restored since. Ngamchö is also a Gelugpa monastery and contains the bed and throne of the Dalai Lama and has a chapel devoted to medicine. The Samten Ling and Drebuling monasteries of the Sakyas still remained in 1959 but have since been destroyed and mostly built over. There is, however, the reconstructed Gelugpa Sang-ngag Zimche Nunnery, in the ruins of Samten Ling with a 1000-armed statue of Chenresig (Avalokiteshvara) said to have been made by Emperor Songtsen Gampo (605 or 617? - 649 CE).

The town supposedly dates back to the founding of the Tsetang Gompa in 1351 which became an important centre of learning.

One of three caves in the mountainside to the east of the town is said to be the birthplace of the Tibetan people who resulted from the mating of a monkey and a beautiful cannibal ogress.

There are several hotels and a guesthouse in Tsetang.

Climate 

Tsetang has a subtropical highland climate (Köppen climate classification Cwa).

Notes

Footnotes

References
 Buckley, Michael and Strauss, Robert. Tibet: a travel survival kit. (1986) Lonely Planet Publications, Victoria, Australia. .
 
 Dorje, Gyurme (2009). Tibet Handbook. Footprint Handbooks, Bath, England. . 
 Dowman, Keith. The Power-Paces of Central Tibet: The Pilgrim's Guide, (1988). Routledge & Kegan Paul, London & New York. .
 Mayhew, Bradley and Kohn, Michael. (2005) Tibet. 6th Edition. .

Populated places in Shannan, Tibet
Township-level divisions of Tibet